Greg Trooper (January 13, 1956 – January 15, 2017) was an American singer-songwriter, whose songs have been recorded by many artists, including Steve Earle, Billy Bragg, and Vince Gill.

History
Trooper was born in Neptune Township, New Jersey, and raised in nearby Little Silver. As a teenager in the early 1970s, Trooper would frequent the folk clubs of Greenwich Village taking in the burgeoning singer/songwriter and blues scene. In 1976, he moved to Austin, Texas, and then to Lawrence, Kansas, where he entered college at the University of Kansas and continued to hone his guitar, singing, and songwriting skills.

Trooper moved to New York City for the 1980s and part of the 1990s, where he formed The Greg Trooper Band along with Larry Campbell on guitar, Greg Shirley on bass, and Walter Thomson on drums. During this time he recorded his first two records: We Won't Dance on Wild Twin Records in 1986 and the critically acclaimed Everywhere produced by Stewart Lerman. Everywhere would later be covered by Billy Bragg on the 1991 album Don't Try This at Home. He also met songwriter/publisher Earl Shuman, who secured Trooper's first publishing deal with CBS Songs. Trooper's records caught the attention of Steve Earle, who recorded Trooper's "Little Sister", and Vince Gill, who covered the title track from Trooper's "We Won't Dance" on his 1989 release "When I Call Your Name".

In the early 1990s, Trooper met fellow New Jerseyite and E Street Band bassist Garry Tallent who, like Trooper, would move to Nashville. Tallent produced Trooper's 1996 album Noises in the Hallway and released it on his D'Ville Record Group label. Popular Demons followed in 1998, on Koch Records and produced by Buddy Miller. After the release of that album, Trooper signed with Nashville indie Eminent Records, which released Straight Down Rain in 2001.

2002 saw the release of Trooper's first live record Between A House and a Hard Place – Live at Pine Hill Farm with Eric "Roscoe" Ambel at the controls. He moved on to the esteemed Sugar Hill Records label in 2003 with the release of Floating followed by the Dan Penn-produced Make It Through This World in 2005. Back Shop Live, another live recording, was released in 2006.

In 2008, Trooper moved back to New York City and in 2009 put out the previously unreleased 1995 recording The Williamsburg Affair. In 2011 he released Upside-Down Town on 52 Shakes Records.

In August 2013, Trooper released his album Incident on Willow Street, also on 52 Shakes Records. According to Trooper, "In these songs, there seemed to be characters that were trying to break away from a bad situation into a better situation or trying to grow out of a stale and stagnant life into a richer life."

Trooper died of pancreatic cancer on January 15, 2017, two days after his 61st birthday.

Discography
 We Won't Dance (as The Greg Trooper Band) (1986)
 Everywhere (1992)
 Noises in the Hallway (1996)
 Popular Demons (1998)
 Straight Down Rain (2001)
 Between A House and a Hard Place: Live At Pine Hill Farm (2002)
 Floating (2003)
 Make It Through This World (2005)
 The BackShop Live (2006)
 The Williamsburg Affair (2009)
 Upside-Down Town (2010)
 Incident On Willow Street (2013)
 Live at the Rock Room (2015)

References

External links 
 
 Dutch website
 No Depression  Issue #33, May–June 2001 | "Greg Trooper: a New Jersey yankee in King Acuff's court" by Jim Musser
 No Depression Issue #44 March–April 2003 | Greg Trooper: Between A House And A Hard Place (McConigel's Mucky Duck) CD review by Barry Mazor
 Greg Trooper interview with Melissa Block, NPR "All Things Considered" April 5, 2005
 USA Today April 11, 2005 CD review by Brian Mansfield 

1956 births
2017 deaths
American folk guitarists
American male guitarists
American folk singers
American male singer-songwriters
Singer-songwriters from New Jersey
People from Little Silver, New Jersey
Guitarists from New Jersey
20th-century American guitarists
20th-century American male musicians
MNRK Music Group artists
Sugar Hill Records artists